Richard Robinson (born ) is a Canadian football player who played professionally for the BC Lions.

References

1940s births
Living people
BC Lions players